Kpan is a Jukunoid language of Taraba State, Nigeria. There are several dialects.

Ethnologue (22nd ed.) lists Gayan, Gindin Dutse, Kato Bagha, Likam, Suntai, and Wukari villages, which are distributed in Sardauna, Takum, and Wukari LGAs.

References

Jukunoid languages
Languages of Nigeria